Vasily Tikhonov (October 1909 – 1987) was a Soviet equestrian. He competed in two events at the 1952 Summer Olympics.

References

External links
 

1909 births
1987 deaths
Soviet male equestrians
Olympic equestrians of the Soviet Union
Equestrians at the 1952 Summer Olympics
Place of birth missing